, (born December 24, 1985) better known by the ring name , is a Japanese professional wrestler. He wrestles in Michinoku Pro Wrestling and All Japan Pro Wrestling.

Professional wrestling career

Toryumon (2002-2004)
Yamamoto made his pro wrestling debut in Toryumon Mexico at only sixteen, being the youngest debutant out of the Último Dragón Gym. Minamino established himself as a major heel and went to feud with top face Taiji Ishimori and his Sailor Boys (Kei and Shu Sato). They had their first bout in Toryumon X, where Minamino unsuccessfully challenged Ishimori for UWA World Welterweight Championship. On August 29, 2004 Minamino got a rematch in Mexico and won the title, retaining it against Taiji on October, 10 with aid from Fukuda and Hanai. The title was vacated after the match. After the Toryumon X demise, Minamino and his colleagues were moved to Michinoku Pro Wrestling.

Michinoku Pro Wrestling (2004-present)
Upon his arrival to Michinoku Pro, Minamino dissociated himself from Los Salseros Japoneses and formed a tag team with Como Leoapard, using a mask and the name Esthetic Jaguar. However, the team fell after the Futaritabi Tag Team League 2004 and Minamino returned to Los Salseros, posing as the top heel team in Michinoku Pro.

The trio won the UWA World Trios Championship from Solar, Ultraman and Ultraman, Jr. in a Toryumon Mexico show, and Minamino captured the Tohoku Junior Heavyweight Championship in a tournament final against Rasse, becoming double champion. His individual reign lasted until May, when he lost his title against Super Delfín. In June, Los Salseros Japoneses lost the UWA World Trios title against STONED (Maguro Ooma, Kei Sato and Shu Sato) by a misaimed attack from Minamino to Hanai, after which Los Salseros Japoneses broke up when Hanai turned on him.

Minamino went solo and turned face, adopting a traditional Japanese attire with a black hakama. He also played Happy Man, an alien character dressed in Superman-like pink attire, and had a title shot against the Tohoku Junior Heavyweight Champion Yoshitsune, but he failed.

In 2008, Minamino turned heel again and became a member of the Kowloon stable, directed by Fujita Hayato. He formed a tag team with Maguro Ooma, which was called Tonery Family. Minamino and Ooma won the Futaritabi Tag Team League 2009 and beat Kesen Numajiro & Kinya Oyanagi to win the Tohoku Tag Team Championship. They retained the title during months, until they dropped it to Yapper Men (Yapper Man #1 & Yapper Man #2). After the dissension of Kowloon, Tonery Family and Ken45º turned tweener and followed Hayato to his new stable, Bad Boy.

Championships and accomplishments
All Japan Pro Wrestling
All Asia Tag Team Championship (1 time) – with Mitsuya Nagai
Gaora TV Championship (1 time)
Apache Pro-Wrestling Army
WEW Tag Team Championship (1 time) – with Maguro Ooma
Michinoku Pro Wrestling
Tohoku Junior Heavyweight Championship (1 time)
Tohoku Tag Team Championship (1 time) – with Maguro Ooma
Futaritabi Tag Team League (2009) – with Maguro Ooma
Toryumon
UWA World Trios Championship (1 time) – with Mango Fukuda and Pineapple Hanai
UWA World Welterweight Championship (1 time)
Young Dragons Cup Tournament (2003)

References

1985 births
Japanese male professional wrestlers
Living people
All Asia Tag Team Champions
Gaora TV Champions
UWA World Trios Champions
21st-century professional wrestlers
UWA World Welterweight Champions
Tohoku Junior Heavyweight Champions
Tohoku Tag Team Champions
WEW World Tag Team Champions